Ian Joseph Evans OAM (born Parkes, New South Wales, 1940) is an Australian author, publisher and historian. Evans discovered the use of deliberately concealed objects to protect Australian houses and other buildings from evil spiritual forces in the period 1788-1935. The author of books on the history and conservation of old Australian houses, Evans contributed to the growth of the heritage movement that spread throughout Australia in the 1980s. His first book, Restoring Old Houses (MacMillan, 1979) is credited with having stimulated the movement. Other books followed, including several published by Evans's family publishing house, The Flannel Flower Press Pty Ltd.

Life and career 
Evans has encouraged the conservation of Australia's architectural heritage. Since 1979, he has produced a substantial body of work on this subject. In writing his books, he has worked with Government authorities including the NSW Department of Planning, the Queensland Museum and the National Trust. In 1988, he was appointed a Trustee of the Historic Houses Trust of New South Wales.

In 1989, Evans acquired and restored the John Mills' residence at 107 Kadumba Street, Yeronga in Brisbane. It was added to the Queensland Heritage Register on 25 August 2000.

Evans's contribution to heritage conservation has facilitated the widespread use of traditional colours on old buildings throughout Australia – a trend which followed the publication of his book Colour Schemes for Old Australian Houses, written in association with the conservation architects Clive Lucas and Ian Stapleton. Local Government authorities and heritage bodies use this book and a companion volume, More Colour Schemes for Old Australian Houses, as the source of traditional colour schemes for houses and other buildings in conservation areas. These books brought traditional exterior colours back into fashion and changed the face of inner-city suburbs in cities throughout Australia.

Evans sought to empower the owners of old houses by providing them with information previously available only to conservation architects and professionals. He argued that the greater part of our built heritage is privately owned and that making authoritative information widely accessible would foster grassroots interest in Australia's heritage of old buildings.

Evans has been involved in campaigns to save individual buildings including the John Verge–designed Lyndhurst at Glebe, which was for a time the headquarters of the Historic Houses Trust of New South Wales. His efforts to stop the destruction of the traditional timber houses of Brisbane received publicity, in The Australian newspaper and on The 7.30 Report in Brisbane and Sydney. Brisbane City Council subsequently enacted planning measures to impede the removal of the timber buildings which are largely responsible for the character of the city.

Between 2002 and 2005, Evans served as architectural historian to the Troodos Archaeological and Environmental Survey Project and prepared a report on traditional buildings in the Troodos Mountains of Cyprus for the Department of Archeology at the University of Glasgow. 

In 2010, Evans received a PhD from the University of Newcastle for his thesis on this topic. Entitled "Touching Magic: Deliberately Concealed Objects in old Australian Houses and Buildings".

From 2017-2019, Evans conducted the Tasmanian Magic Project, looking for apotropaic marks like hexafoils and burn marks at numerous historic properties in Tasmania's Midlands and in the Western Districts of Victoria Southern Midlands.

Evans was educated at Catholic and State schools in Parkes before moving to Sydney in 1959; copy boy and cadet journalist at Mirror Newspapers 1959–61; journalist at ATN7 News 1961–72; PR consultant 1972–79; author, publisher, heritage consultant 1979–present. He was awarded the Medal of the Order of Australia in 2005 for service to the preservation of the architectural heritage of Australia and a PhD from the University of Newcastle in 2010.

Awards

Publications 
  
 
 
 
 
 
 
  
 
  
 
 
 
 
 Evans, Ian (1981). The Lithgow Pottery. The Flannel Flower Press.

References

External links 
 Interview with Rachel Kohn, The Spirit of Things, ABC Radio National, 15 July 2012
 Duncan Kennedy "Concealed shoes: Australian settlers and an old superstition", BBC World News, 15 March 2012 
 ABC-TV, 7.30 Tasmania: Fiona Breen, "Ritual Magic" 28 November 2011 
 ABC TV, Rewind: Talismans, 17 October 2004. Transcript
 Ian Evans's World of Old Houses
 ABC TV, Landline, 12 October 2014

Australian historians
Living people
1940 births